Eurekster was a New Zealand-based company that built social search engines for use on websites, which were referred to as "swickis" (for "search plus wiki"). The company was based in Christchurch, with an office in San Francisco, California. It was co-founded by Grant Ryan and Steven Marder, who served as its chief scientist and CEO, respectively. Ryan is also the co-founder and chairman of the Christchurch-based company SLI Systems, which specialize in search engines that learns from users. According to Marder, "Eurekster pioneered vertical, social search..."

Eurekster launched to the public on 21 January 2004.

In 2007, Eurekster hosted around 100,000 swickis for various websites, which total approximately 20 million searches per month, or around 800,000 searches per day.

The company shut down sometime after 2010.

Praise

In May 2006, Red Herring selected Eurekster as one of their favorite companies that push the technological limits in North America.

Eurekster was, on 17 January 2007, announced one of the 100 best companies by AlwaysOn Media 100. The selection was made by focusing on "innovation, market potential, commercialization, stakeholder value creation, and media attention or 'buzz'".

References 

Technology companies of New Zealand
Information technology in New Zealand
Social networking services
Social search